Verkhneye Abdryashevo (Ürge Äbdräş) is a rural locality (a village) in Almukhametovsky Selsoviet, Abzelilovsky District, Bashkortostan, Russia. The population was 458 as of 2010. There are 6 streets.

Geography 
Verkhneye Abdryashevo is located 62 km south of Askarovo (the district's administrative centre) by road. Almukhametovo is the nearest rural locality.

References 

Rural localities in Abzelilovsky District